MetroTrolley is a battery electric vehicle developed in response to zero emission rail car requirements in certain environments. It was created in the hopes to replace the RRV Hi-Rail type road-rail vehicle that is used for ultrasonic rail flaw detection as well as non-zero emission trolleys that do not have full rail inspection capabilities. It was developed in 2007 by the Centre for Advanced Transport Engineering and Research (CATER) in Western Australia primarily for ultrasonic rail flaw detection.

A newly developed alternative is the HANDWave DRT (Dual Rail Tester). It is capable of performing ultrasonic rail flaw detection equivalent to current rail bound testers, and can be separated into two separate Single Rail Testers (HANDWave SRT) or towed behind a rail vehicle.

See also
Battery-electric locomotive
 Railroad speeder
 Ultrasonic

References 
 Centre for Advanced Transport Engineering and Research
 Alternative HANDWave DRT

Maintenance of way equipment